Alejandro Salvador Nava (born September 17, 1997, in Toluca, State of Mexico) is a Mexican professional footballer who last played for UACH F.C. He made his professional debut with Potros UAEM during an Ascenso MX match against Murciélagos on 22 July 2016.

References

External links

1997 births
Living people
Association football defenders
Potros UAEM footballers
Cruz Azul Hidalgo footballers
UACH F.C. footballers
Ascenso MX players
Liga Premier de México players
Tercera División de México players
People from Toluca
Footballers from the State of Mexico
Mexican footballers